The Jean Gras was a small scale French automobile manufactured by a concern based in Issy-les-Moulineaux, Paris from 1924 until 1927. 

The company showed two cars at the Paris 1924 Salon, the Type A had a 1494 cc overhead camshaft engine and the Type B a 1200 cc pushrod overhead valve unit. Both engines were supplied by C.I.M.E.. Four wheel brakes using the Perrot system were fitted and the chassis carried a six-light saloon body.

In 1927 a six-cylinder model with 1557 cc engine was added to the range.

The cars were built in the former Philos factory at Lyon. 

A Jean Gras took part in the 1925 300 mile race at Montlhéry, France, finishing fifth.

References 
David Burgess Wise, The New Illustrated Encyclopedia of Automobiles.

Defunct motor vehicle manufacturers of France